Covers of the Damned is the third EP by American metalcore band Atreyu. It is for the band's Congregation of the Damned Tour, in support of their fifth album, Congregation of the Damned. The performers were a collaboration of Atreyu, along with their tourmates Blessthefall, Chiodos, Endless Hallway and Architects. Two songs were performed by Atreyu alone, one was by Endless Hallway featuring Travis Miguel of Atreyu, and the last two were a collaboration of certain members from each band.

Track listing

Personnel
Atreyu
Alex Varkatzas – lead vocals
Dan Jacobs – lead guitar
Travis Miguel – rhythm guitar, additional guitar on track 2
Marc "Porter" McKnight – bass
Brandon Saller – drums, co-lead vocals

Endless Hallway
Ryan Jackson – vocals
Jono Evans – guitars
Micheal Tye – guitars
Evan McCarthy – bass
Joe Mullen – drums

References

2010 EPs
Atreyu (band) albums
Covers EPs